Namik Glacier is situated in the Pithoragarh district of Uttarakhand state in India.

Geography 
This glacier is the source of the Ramganga River. The glacier is surrounded by the following peaks: Nanda Devi , Nanda Kot , and Trishuli . The glacier falls on ancient Indo-Tibet trade route. It is  trekking from Liti and situated at the villages of Gogina and Namik. There are a number of waterfalls and sulphur springs originating around this glacier. The glacier can be reached by trekking from gogina on the sama liti Road near. Jeeps can be hired from Bageshwar or Kapkot up to Gogina. 'Namik' means a place where saline water springs are present.

See also
 List of glaciers

References

Hiking trails in Uttarakhand
Glaciers of Uttarakhand
Geography of Pithoragarh district
Bageshwar district